American Red Ball is a moving company operating worldwide. It was founded in Indianapolis in 1919 as American Red Ball Transit Co. Inc.

In 1996, owners Walter and AliceJo Saubert sold the company to Atlas World Group. At the time it was the 13th largest mover in the United States. The domestic subsidiary was spun off to management in 2001. Atlas retained Red Ball International, a military mover.

References

External links 
 Official web site

Moving companies of the United States
Transport companies established in 1919
1919 establishments in Indiana
Companies based in Indianapolis